Gaius Cestius Gallus (d. 67 AD) was a Roman senator and general who was active during the Principate. He was suffect consul for the second nundinium of the year 42 as the colleague of Gaius Caecina Largus. Gallus was the son of Gaius Cestius Gallus, ordinary consul in 35.

Governor of Syria
Gallus was proconsul of Syria from 63 or 65.  He marched into Judea with a force of over 30,000 men in September 66 in an attempt to restore order at the outset of the First Jewish–Roman War. As assembled at Antioch, Gallus' army comprised Legio XII Fulminata, detachments from the three other legions based in Syria, six cohorts of auxiliary infantry and four alae of cavalry. These regular troops were supported by 14,000 allies provided by Agrippa II and other client rulers.

Jewish Revolt
With his force reduced by detachments sent to occupy Galilee and the Judean coast, Gallus turned inland to subdue Jerusalem. After suffering losses amongst his baggage train and rearguard, Gallus reached Mount Scopus and penetrated the outer city, but was apparently unable to take The Temple Mount. After a siege of nine days, Gallus decided to fall back to the coast. His decision appears to have been based on the loss of siege equipment by ambush and the threatened cutting of his supply lines as the October rains began.

The war-like faction in Jerusalem, under Shimon bar Giora, rose up against the Roman contingent, pursuing them as far as Antipatris, via Beit Horon.

Josephus initially estimated the number of Roman losses at 515, but in the ensuing rout, the dead among the Imperial Roman army numbered 5300 infantrymen, and 380 cavalrymen. This incident befell the Roman army in the lunar month of Heshvan, during the 12th year of the reign of Nero, and marked the beginning of the war with Rome.

Death
Soon after his return to Syria, and before the spring of 67, Gallus died. According to Titus Flavius Josephus the legate was broken by shame at a major and unexpected Roman defeat. Gallus was succeeded in the governorship of Syria by Licinius Mucianus. Emperor Nero appointed the future Emperor Vespasian as commander of the Roman forces assembled in the province to crush the rebellion in Judea.

See also
 Cestia gens

References

Tacitus, Hist. v. 10, 13
Suetonius, Vespasian, 4
Josephus, Bell. Jud. ii. 14-20
Emil Schürer, History of the Jewish People, 1st edn. div. i. vol. ii. p. 212 (Eng. tr., 1890); vol. 1, pp. 487f of Vermes and Millar's 1973 re-edition.
 S. G. F. Brandon, 'The Defeat of Cestius Gallus', A.D. 66, History Today vol.xx. pp. 38–46 (1970)

67 deaths
1st-century Roman consuls
1st-century Roman governors of Syria
Generals of Nero
Imperial Roman consuls
Year of birth unknown
People of the First Jewish–Roman War
Roman legates
Cestii